Fedotovo is a rural locality (a village) in Pyatovskoye Rural Settlement, Totemsky District, Vologda Oblast, Russia. The population was 22 as of 2002.

Geography 
Fedotovo is located 16 km north of Totma (the district's administrative centre) by road. Kuzemkino is the nearest rural locality.

References 

Rural localities in Totemsky District